Xyroptila colluceo is a moth of the family Pterophoridae. It is known from New Guinea.

References

colluceo
Moths described in 2007